Jordan College may refer to:
Jordan College, Oxford, a fictional college in the His Dark Materials book trilogy and related works
Jordan College of Fine Arts at Butler University
Jordan College (Michigan), a now defunct college that was in Michigan
Jordan University College, a constituent college of St. Augustine University of Tanzania